The 1961 West Chester Golden Rams men's soccer team represented the West Chester University during the 1961 NCAA men's soccer season. The Golden Rams were an independent, and had a perfect 13–0–0 record throughout the season. The Rams went on to win the 1961 NCAA Men's Soccer Championship by defeating the two-time defending champions, Saint Louis Billikens, 2–0 in the final. West Chester's roster included future Indiana soccer coaching legend Jerry Yeagley. This made West Chester the second ever team to win the NCAA Soccer title.

Schedule 

|-
!colspan=6 style="background:#660099; color:#FFD700;"| Regular season
|-

|-

|-

|-

|-

|-
!colspan=6 style="background:#660099; color:#FFD700;"| NCAA Tournament

|-

References 
Primary
 
 
 
Footnotes

External links 
 West Chester Golden Rams Men's Soccer

West Chester Golden Rams men's soccer seasons
1961 NCAA soccer independents season
1961 in sports in Pennsylvania
NCAA Division I Men's Soccer Tournament-winning seasons
NCAA Division I Men's Soccer Tournament College Cup seasons